Magdalen (or Magdalene) was launched in Mehil, Fife in 1802. From 1804 to 1805 she served on convoy duty in the North Sea for the British Royal Navy as a hired armed ship. She then returned to mercantile service and continued to sail for over 45 years, going as far as Malta and Quebec, though mostly sailing along Britain's coasts. She was last listed in Lloyd's Register (LR) in 1853.

Career
Magdalen first appeared in the Register of Shipping in the supplemental pages to the 1802 volume. It showed her with Brown, master, Scougal, owner, and trade Leith-Petersburg.

The Royal Navy hired her on 14 April 1804. During the term of government service Lloyd's Register (LR) carried Magadalena as a Leith-based transport. Her captain was Commander Joseph L.Popham.

Lloyd's List (LL) reported on 27 July 1804 that Magdalen armed ship had arrived at Leith from Tonningen. On 10 August Magdalen armed ship had arrived at Tonningen from Leith.

Lloyd's List reported on 21 May 1805 that the armed brig Magdalen had run afoul of Atalanta in the Naze of Norway. Atalanta, Humble, master, had been sailing to Copenhagen and had to put back to Newcastle. Then on 28 May it reported that the armed ships Magdalen, Ranger, and  had arrived at Elsinore on 14 May with their convoy.

Magdalens contract finished on 19 December 1805.

The Register of Shipping for 1806 showed Magdalen with Hopkins, master, Scougal, owner, and trade Leith–Government service.

In 1806–1807 Magdalen was in the Mediterranean. On 29 November 1806 Magdalen, Hopkins, master, arrived at Cagliari. She was returning to London from Malta, but had it had taken her 53 days to get that far.

Fate
Magadalene was last listed in Lloyd's Register in 1853.

Citations and references
Citations

References
 

1802 ships
Age of Sail merchant ships of England
Hired armed vessels of the Royal Navy